Boissière is a station of the Paris Métro serving line 6 at the intersection of the Rue Boissière and the Avenue Kleber in the 16th arrondissement.

The station opened on 2 October 1900 as a branch of line 1 from Étoile to Trocadéro. On 5 November 1903 this line was extended to Passy and the line from Étoile to Trocadéro and Passy became known as line 2 South as part of a planned ring line around central Paris to be built under or over the boulevards built in place of the demolished Wall of the Farmers-General; this circle is now operated as two lines: 2 and 6. On 14 October 1907 the line from Étoile to Trocadéro, Place d'Italie and Gare du Nord became part of line 5. On 6 October 1942 the section of line 5 from Étoile to Place d'Italie, including Boissière, was transferred to line 6.

In 1730, Rue Boissière was a road out of the city which was an extension of the Rue de la Croix-Boissière (French for "street of the wooden cross") inside Paris.  Its name came from the custom of remembering the crucifixion by hanging up boxwood on Palm Sunday. The station is close to the location of the Barrière des Réservoirs, a gate built for the collection of taxation as part of the Wall of the Farmers-General; the gate was built between 1784 and 1788 and demolished in the nineteenth century.

Station layout

References

Paris Métro stations in the 16th arrondissement of Paris
Railway stations in France opened in 1900